Jason Hartless (born November 5, 1994) is an American musician, best known for being the drummer for guitarist and fellow Detroit native Ted Nugent. He has also toured and/or recorded with Eric Martin (musician), Pop Evil, Sponge, Mitch Ryder, Tantric, Insane Clown Posse, Warrior Soul and Joe Lynn Turner.

In early 2020, Hartless earned his bachelor's degree in Music Business from the Berklee College of Music

Personal life 
Jason Michael Hartless was born on November 5, 1994, in Detroit, Michigan and was the first child of Jason and Shelly Hartless. Hartless grew up in Fraser, Michigan, where he graduated high school from Fraser High School in 2013. He started to play drums as a child and grew up listening mainly to bands such as The Who, T-Rex, The Sweet, Kiss and Styx. Hartless cites Corky Laing, Eric Singer, Mick Tucker and Buddy Rich as early influences to his playing style.
Jason's influences include: Corky Laing, Jeff Porcaro, Buddy Rich, Todd Sucherman, Keith Moon, Zak Starkey, Bernie Dresel, Anton Fig, Eric Singer, Stewart Copeland, Mick Tucker, Steve Smith, and Vinnie Colaiuta.

Career 
At a very early age, Hartless was always intrigued by the drums and was born into a musical environment. His father, Jason was a professional drummer in the Detroit area.  By five, Hartless began playing cover gigs with an all-adult band around Metro Detroit. A videotape of Hartless playing the Mountain song, "Nantucket Sleighride" caught the eye of Mountain drummer, Corky Laing, who then contacted Hartless' family inquiring to work with him. In 2002, Laing began mentoring Hartless and by that summer they began recording Hartless' solo album, titled First Division. For two years, Laing commuted from Toronto to Detroit to work and record with Hartless until the record was released in the summer of 2004. First Division included Hartless on drums and vocals, Laing on guitar and vocals and Richie Scarlet from the Ace Frehley Band on guitar and bass.

In 2005, Hartless was asked to come to Millbrook Recording Studios in Millbrook, New York to record a track on Richie Scarlet's release, Revelation Supreme. During this session, Hartless met legendary drummer Anton Fig; Fig was cutting a track on Scarlet's record as well. During Fig's session, Fig showed Hartless some of his techniques for charting music and recording drums in the studio. In late 2005, Hartless joined forces with the Toys for Tots foundation and began a yearly Rockin' 4 Tots drive outside a Toys R US in suburban Detroit. Various musicians from the Detroit area participated every year for this daylong event, such as Vinnie Dombroski from Sponge and Joey Gaydos from the film School of Rock.

In early 2007, Hartless got a call from Brian Schram, ex-lead guitar player for Uncle Kracker, to come to Toronto and record a track on his 2007 release, Disturbing the Peace because their drummer had a family emergency and had to cancel last minute. A few months later, Hartless received another call from Schram to fill in on drums with his band, The Brian Schram Band, who was opening for Les Claypool the next night at the Rave Ballroom in Milwaukee, Wisconsin. Hartless was offered the full-time seat after the show. Hartless toured across the east coast of the US in the summer of 2007 with the Schram Band supporting the release of Disturbing the Peace at the age of 12. In October 2007, Hartless and the band flew to Winnipeg, Manitoba and recorded some demos with former Nickelback producer, Dale Penner. During a run of shows in Toronto, Corky Laing suggested that the name of the band be changed from The Brian Schram Band to Shram.

During January 2008, Shram began the two-month long, Loco Tour with The Dreaming as direct support. Throughout the year, Hartless and the band recorded the theme songs for The Next Bite and John Gillespie's Woods and Water fishing television shows on Versus TV.

At 14 years old, Hartless and Shram toured on Mötley Crüe's Crue Fest 2 North American tour in the summer of 2009 in support of the band's release, Shut Up and Press Play.

In April 2011, Hartless released his debut educational DVD, Learn To Rock Drums With Jason Hartless And Friends, partnered with Drumfun and distributed through Hal Leonard.

In the summer of 2012, Hartless studied at Berklee College of Music in Boston, MA and received a full tuition scholarship for the Berklee summer program. During his time studying there, Hartless studied with percussion education legend Kim Plainfield.

In late 2012, Hartless joined Pistol Day Parade. With the band riding off of high popularity in the Michigan/Mid-West region, Goomba Music signed the band to a record deal. The band's debut release, BURN was released in the summer of 2013. The first single off of BURN, "Not Today", charted at #34 on the Mainstream Rock Charts in October 2013. During the summer of 2014, Pistol Day Parade toured with fellow Detroit native, Ted Nugent on the Shut Up and Jam tour. "Rockstars Girlfriend", the last single off of the band's release, charted at #19 on Mainstream Rock charts in Fall 2014.

In Spring 2016, Hartless replaced Dokken drummer, Mick Brown on drums for Ted Nugent.

From 2016 to 2022, Hartless served as a managing partner of Detroit based record label, Prudential Music Group. In September of 2022, Hartless announced that he was reforming his family's defunct label, Sound City Records.

With 2020 and 2021 Ted Nugent tours canceled due to Covid, Hartless toured with Sponge from August 2020 until June 2021. Hartless then filled in for drummer Hayley Cramer with Pop Evil during their summer 2021 tour. In Fall of 2022, Hartless toured with Eric Martin (musician) from Mr. Big (American band) during Michael Schenker 50th anniversary US tour.

Selected Discography

As Drummer
 Jason Hartless Jr. - First Division (2004)
 Richie Scarlet – Revelation Supreme (2005)
 Gun Shy – Gun Shy (2007)
 Brian Schram – Disturbing The Peace (2007)
 Brian Schram – Rockin' Fish Tales (2008)
 SHRAM – Molly EP (2009)
 SHRAM – Shut Up And Press Play (2009)
 Brian Schram – Rockin' Fish Tales III (2012)
 Pistol Day Parade – Burn (2013)
 Jayme Orr – Healed (2016)
 Joe Jermano – The People Inside (2016)
 If Walls Could Talk – What Would They Say? (2016) (Drums on "Beautiful You")
 Steve Salter – Gleaming (2016)
 Gary Garris – Stuck On You (2016)
 Antonio Cipriano – Never Gonna Be the Same (2016)
 Sami Mei – Puppets (2016)
 By The Way Girls – Introducing By the Way (2016)
 Joe Jermano – Dreaming In Color (2017)
 Rustic Union – Fearless (2017)
 Nicholas Wolf – Invincible (2017)
 Sami Mei – Brighter Than The Stars (2017)
 Brittan Church – Breathe into Me (2018)
 Pompeii – The Secret Sessions (2018) (Drums on "Growing Old with Rock & Roll (2017 Re-Record)")
 Max Ater – Small Town EP (2018)
 Ted Nugent – The Music Made Me Do It (2018)
 Corky Laing – Toledo Sessions (2019) (Additional Percussion)
 SHRAM – Winnipeg Sessions 2007 EP (2020)
 Tantric (band) – Breakdown (Re-Record) (2021)
 Pistol Day Parade – Live & Out (2021)
 Tantric (band) – The Sum of All Things (2021)
 Insane Clown Posse – Yum Yum Bedlam (2021) (Drums on "Heart & Soul")
 Mike Skill – In The Midnight Hour (2022)
 Ted Nugent – Detroit Muscle (2022)
 Sponge (band) – Wax Ecstatic ReDux (2022)
 Tano Jones revelry – Spinning North (2022)

Videography
 Learn To Rock Drums With Jason Hartless & Friends (2012)
 Ted Nugent – Live at Freedom Hill (2018)
 Ted Nugent's Spirit of The Wild TV (Various Episodes)

As Producer
 Pompeii – The Secret Sessions (2018) (Executive Producer)
 The Sweet – Level Headed Tour Rehearsals 1977 (2018) (Executive Producer)
 Seduce – Seduce (2018) (Reissue Executive Producer)
 The Rationals – The Rationals (Deluxe Edition) (2018) (Reissue Executive Producer)
 Max Ater – Small Town EP (2018) (Drums & Executive Producer)
 Corky Laing – Toledo Sessions (2019) (Executive Producer & Mixing)
 Los Lobotomys – Los Lobotomys (2019) (Vinyl Reissue Executive Producer)
 Seduce – Too Much Ain't Enough (2020) (Reissue Executive Producer & Mastering Engineer)
 The Sweet – Isolation Boulevard (2020) (Vinyl Executive Producer)
 The Sweet – Platinum Rare VOL 1 (2021) (Executive Producer)
 Toby Redd – In The Light (2021) (Reissue Executive Producer)
 Ted Nugent – Detroit Muscle (2022) (Associate Producer)
 The Sweet – Platinum Rare VOL 2 (2022) (Executive Producer)
 The Sweet – Give Us A Wink (Alt Mixes & Demos) (2022) (Producer)
 Ted Nugent – Spirit of The Wild (2022) (Reissue Executive Producer)
 Ted Nugent – Fan The Flame (2022) (Mixing Engineer)

Equipment 
Pearl Drums:
President Series Deluxe
 24"x14" Bassdrum
 13"x9" Tom
 16"x16" Floortom
 18"x18" Floortom
 14"x5" 1978 COB Snare

Sabian Cymbals

Remo Drumheads

Jason Hartless Signature Vater Drumsticks 5A model

References

External links 
 
 
 
 

American rock drummers
1994 births
Living people
People from Fraser, Michigan
Ted Nugent Band members
21st-century American drummers